Allan Wilson (born 5 August 1954) is a former Scottish Labour Party politician. He was a Member of the Scottish Parliament (MSP) for the  Cunninghame North constituency, a seat which he held from the inaugural Scottish Parliament general election in 1999 until his defeat at the 2007 election.

He was educated at Glengarnock Primary school and at Spier's school near Beith, Ayrshire, and worked as a trades union official with NUPE and UNISON until his election to the Scottish Parliament. He was a member of the Executive of the Scottish Labour Party from 1992 until 1999 and election agent for Brian Wilson.

He was Labour lead on the Scottish Parliament's Enterprise and Lifelong Learning Committee and also a member of the European Committee prior to becoming Deputy Minister for Tourism, Culture and Sport in October 2000 and then Deputy Minister for Environment and Rural Development in November 2001 in the Scottish Executive. In October 2004 he was appointed Deputy Minister for Enterprise and Lifelong Learning.

He is married, has two sons, and lives in Kilbirnie. He was a member of the Scottish Parliamentary football team, current holders of the four nations' Parliamentary Trophy (Parliamentary Shield) and Chairman of Kilbirnie Community Football Club comprising 15 teams and for over thirty years a former player, coach and manager of various Ayrshire juvenile, amateur and junior teams in the Scottish Junior Football Association, Scottish Amateur Football Association and the Scottish Football Association.

In the 2007 Scottish Parliament Election he lost his seat Cunninghame North to the Scottish National Party's Kenny Gibson, by only 48 votes in an election with over a thousand spoilt ballot papers, making it the most marginal seat in the country. Wilson originally wished to challenge the result via a recount but the Scottish Labour Party, following advice from their solicitors, did not proceed with an election petition on his behalf.
In the 2011 election, Wilson again stood against Gibson for the Cunninghame North seat, but this time lost more emphatically, with Gibson's majority increasing from 48 to 6,117.

See also 
List of Scottish Executive Ministerial Teams

References

External links
Allan Wilson MSP – official website 
 

1954 births
Living people
People from Kilbirnie
Scottish trade unionists
Labour MSPs
Members of the Scottish Parliament 1999–2003
Members of the Scottish Parliament 2003–2007